The 2020 Boston College Eagles women's soccer team represented Boston College during the 2020 NCAA Division I women's soccer season.  The Eagles were led by head coach Jason Lowe, in his second season.  They played home games at Newton Campus Soccer Field.  This is the team's 40th season playing organized women's college soccer, and their 16th playing in the Atlantic Coast Conference.

Due to the COVID-19 pandemic, the ACC played a reduced schedule in 2020 and the NCAA Tournament was postponed to 2021.  The ACC did not play a spring league schedule, but did allow teams to play non-conference games that would count toward their 2020 record in the lead up to the NCAA Tournament.

The Eagles finished the fall season 1–7–0, 1–7–0 in ACC play to finish in a tie for eleventh place. They did not qualify for the ACC Tournament.  They finished the spring season 2–3–1 and were not invited to the NCAA Tournament.

Previous season 

The Eagles finished the season 8–8–2 overall, and 1–8–1 in ACC play to finish in fourteenth place.  They did not qualify for the ACC Tournament and were not invited to the NCAA Tournament.

Squad

Roster

Updated October 8, 2020

Team management

Source:

Schedule

Source:

|-
!colspan=6 style=""| Fall Regular season

|-
!colspan=6 style=""| Spring Regular season

Rankings

Fall 2020

Spring 2021

References

Boston College
Boston College Eagles women's soccer seasons
Boston College Eagles soccer, women's